Yacine El Amri (born 22 July 2004) is a professional footballer who plays as a winger for Valenciennes in the French Ligue 2. Born in France, he is a youth international for Morocco.

Professional career
El Amri is a youth product of CTEFC, and moved to Valenciennes's youth side on 27 April 2019. On 30 May 2020, he signed his first professional contract with Valenciennes until June 2023. He made his professional debut and Ligue 2 debut with Valenciennes as an early substitute in a 1–0 win over Le Havre on 6 August 2022.

International career
El Amri is born in France to a Moroccan father and a French mother. He was called up to the Morocco U17s for a set of friendlies in October 2020. He was called to the Morocco U20s in November 2021 for a training camp.

References

External links
 
 Ligue 2 profile

2004 births
Living people
People from Château-Thierry
Moroccan footballers
Morocco youth international footballers
French footballers
French sportspeople of Moroccan descent
Association football wingers
Valenciennes FC players
Ligue 2 players
Championnat National 3 players